Cytoplasmic FMR1-interacting protein 2 is a protein that in humans is encoded by the CYFIP2 gene. It is expressed mainly in brain tissues, white blood cells and the kidney.

Interactions 

CYFIP2 has been shown to interact with FMR1. CYFIP2 is a p-53 inducible protein and also interacts with the Fragile=X mental retardation protein.

RNA editing 

The pre-mRNA of this protein is subject to RNA editing. The editing site was previously recorded as a single nucleotide polymorphism (rs3207362) in the dbSNP.

Type 

A to I RNA editing is catalyzed by a family of adenosine deaminases acting on RNA (ADARs) that specifically recognize adenosines within double-stranded regions of pre-mRNAs and deaminate  them to inosine. Inosines  are recognised as guanosine by the cells translational machinery. There are three members of the ADAR family ADARs 1-3 with ADAR1  and ADAR2 being the only enzymatically active members. ADAR3 is thought to have a regulatory role in the brain.  ADAR1 and ADAR 2 are widely expressed in tissues while ADAR3 is restricted to the brain. The double stranded regions of RNA are formed  by base-pairing between residues in the close to region of the editing site with residues usually in a  neighboring intron but can be an exonic sequence. The region that base pairs with the editing region is known as an Editing Complementary Sequence (ECS).

Site 

An editing site was found in the pre-mRNA of this protein. The substitution occurs within amino acid position 320 in humans and also in mice. A possible  double stranded RNA region has not been detected for this pre-mRNA. No double stranded region required by ADARs has predicted. Immunoprecipitation experiments and RNA interference have shown that ADAR 2 is likely to be the main editing enzyme for this site with ADAR 1 having a minor role.

Regulation 

Editing seems to be differentially regulated in different tissues. The highest level of editing occurs in the cerebellum with lower frequency of editing detected in human lung, prostrate and uterus tissues. Editing frequency varies from 30-85% depending on tissue.{ There is some evidence for a  decrease in CYFIP2 editing with increased age.

Conservation 

Editing of the pre-mRNA of this gene has been detected in mouse and chicken.

Effects of RNA editing

Structural 

Editing results in a codon change resulting in a glutamic acid being translated instead of a lysine.

Functional 

Currently unknown but editing may have role in regulation of  apoptotic functions of this protein. It is thought that since the protein is p53 inducible that the protein may be pro-apopototic. Also ADAR1 knock out mice show increase in apoptosis which indicates editing may be involved in regulation of the cellular  process.

References

External links

Further reading